George Jackson (January 9, 1757May 17, 1831) was an American farmer, lawyer, and politician.

Biography
Born in Cecil County in the Province of Maryland to John and Elizabeth (Cummins) Jackson, his family moved to Virginia. He served in the Virginia militia during the American Revolutionary War, attaining the rank of colonel.

He later studied law and entered state politics, becoming a member of the Virginia House of Delegates. In 1788 he was a delegate to the Virginia Ratifying Convention, which ratified the United States Constitution. He was elected to the United States House of Representatives and served from 1795 to 1797 and 1799 to 1803. In about 1806, Jackson moved to Zanesville, Ohio, and served in the state legislature. He died there on May 17, 1831 and was buried in Falls Township.

Family
George Jackson was married to Elizabeth Brake (daughter of John Brake) and was the father of United States Representatives John G. Jackson and Edward B. Jackson

Electoral history

1795; Jackson was elected to the U.S. House of Representatives unopposed.
1797; Jackson was defeated in his bid for re-election.
1799; Jackson was re-elected with 53.94% of the vote, defeating a Federalist identified only as Haymond.
1801; Jackson was re-elected with 84.05% of the vote, defeating Federalist Jonathan J. Jacobs.

References

1757 births
1831 deaths
Delegates to the Virginia Ratifying Convention
18th-century American politicians
Virginia militiamen in the American Revolution
Virginia lawyers
Members of the Virginia House of Delegates
Members of the Ohio House of Representatives
Ohio state senators
Politicians from Zanesville, Ohio
Jackson family of West Virginia
People from Cecil County, Maryland
Democratic-Republican Party members of the United States House of Representatives from Virginia